Miss World 1955, the 5th edition of the Miss World pageant, was held on 20 October 1955 at the Lyceum Ballroom in London, United Kingdom. 21 contestants competed for the crown. Eunice Gayson crowned Susana Duijm of Venezuela as the new Miss World. The previous year's Miss World, Antigone Costanda of Egypt, did not attend because of hostilities between Egypt and United Kingdom over Suez Canal. That was the first time Venezuela won the title of Miss World. This was the first time that a winner had been crowned with the crown on her head. Duijm also placed Top 15 in Miss Universe 1955.

Results

Contestants

  - Beverly Prowse
  - Felicitas Von Goebel
  - Rosette Ghislain
  - Viola Sita Gunarate
  - Gilda Marín
  - Karin Palm-Rasmussen
  - Mirva Orvakki Arvinen
  - Gisele Thierry
  - Beate Kruger
  - Jennifer Chimes
  - Tzoulia Georgia Coumoundourou
  - Angelina Kalkhoven
  - Pastora Pagán Valenzuela
  - Arna Hjörleifsdóttir
  - Evelyn Foley
  - Miriam Kotler
  - Franca Incorvaia
  - Josette Travers
  - Anita Åstrand
  - Margaret Anne Haywood
  - Susana Duijm †

Notes

Debuts

Returns
Last competed in 1953:

Withdrawals
  - Gladys Hoene

References

External links
 Miss World official website

Miss World
1955 in London
1955 beauty pageants
Beauty pageants in the United Kingdom
October 1955 events in the United Kingdom